Sundacossus timur is a moth in the family Cossidae. It was described by Yakovlev in 2006. It is found on  Flores.

The length of the forewings is about 26 mm. The forewings are grey with a distinct pattern of dark strokes. The hindwings are uniform dark-grey.

References

Natural History Museum Lepidoptera generic names catalog

Cossinae
Moths described in 2006